The Netherlands competed at the 2020 Summer Olympics in Tokyo. Originally scheduled to take place from 24 July to 9 August 2020, the Games were postponed to 23 July to 8 August 2021, because of the COVID-19 pandemic. Since the nation's official debut in 1900, Dutch athletes have competed at every edition of the Summer Olympic Games, with the exception of the 1904 Summer Olympics in St. Louis and 1956 Summer Olympics in Melbourne, which the Netherlands boycotted because of the Soviet invasion of Hungary.

Medalists

On 28 July, the Netherlands won 8 medals on a single day, which broke the country's previous record of 7 established on 11 August 1928 during the 1928 Summer Olympics in Amsterdam.

| width="78%" align="left" valign="top" |

| width="22%" align="left" valign="top" |

Competitors
The following is the list of number of Dutch competitors in the Games.

Archery

Three Dutch archers qualified for the men's events by reaching the quarterfinal stage of the men's team recurve at the 2019 World Archery Championships in 's-Hertogenbosch. Another Dutch archer scored a shoot-off victory in the quarterfinal round of the women's individual recurve to book an outright Olympic berth available at the 2019 European Games in Minsk, Belarus.

Artistic swimming

The Netherlands fielded a squad of two artistic swimmers to compete in the women's duet event, by finishing fourth at the 2021 FINA Olympic Qualification Tournament in Barcelona, Spain.

Athletics

Dutch athletes further achieved the entry standards, either by qualifying time or by world ranking, in the following track and field events (up to a maximum of 3 athletes in each event):

Track & road events
Men

Women

Mixed

 Athletes who participated in the heat only.

Field events

Combined events – Women's heptathlon

Badminton

The Netherlands entered 4 badminton players for the following events based on the BWF Race to Tokyo Rankings; one in the men's singles, one pair in the women's doubles and mixed doubles.

Basketball

Summary

3x3 basketball

Men's tournament

Netherlands men's national 3x3 team qualified for the Olympics by securing a top three finish at the 2021 Olympic Qualifying Tournament.

Team roster
The players were announced on 6 July 2021.

Ross Bekkering
Dimeo van der Horst
Arvin Slagter
Jessey Voorn

Group play

Quarterfinal

Boxing

The Netherlands entered two boxers (one per gender) into the Olympic tournament. Rio 2016 Olympians Enrico Lacruz (men's lightweight) and Nouchka Fontijn (women's middleweight) secured the spots on the Dutch squad in their respective weight divisions, either by winning the round of 16 match, advancing to the semifinal match, or scoring a box-off triumph, at the 2020 European Qualification Tournament in Villebon-sur-Yvette, France.

Canoeing

Slalom
The Netherlands qualified one canoeist for the women's K-1 class by finishing in the top eighteen at the 2019 ICF Canoe Slalom World Championships in La Seu d'Urgell, Spain, marking the country's recurrence to the sport after a twelve-year absence.

Cycling

Road
The Netherlands entered a squad of nine riders (five men and four women) to compete in their respective Olympic road races, by virtue of their top 50 national finish (for men) and top 22 (for women) in the UCI World Ranking.

Men

Women

Track
Following the completion of the 2020 UCI Track Cycling World Championships, Dutch riders accumulated spots for both men and women in team sprint, omnium, and madison, based on their country's results in the final UCI Olympic rankings. As a result of their place in the men's and women's team sprint, the Netherlands won its right to enter two riders in both men's and women's sprint and men's and women's keirin.

Sprint

Team sprint

Qualification legend: FA=Gold medal final; FB=Bronze medal final
 Athlete who participated in the qualification round only.

Keirin

Qualification legend: Q=Qualified for next round; R=Advanced to repechage

Omnium

Madison

Mountain biking
Dutch mountain bikers qualified for two men's and two women's quota places into the Olympic cross-country race, as a result of the nation's fifth-place finish for men and third for women in the UCI Olympic Ranking List of 16 May 2021.

BMX
The Netherlands received six quota spots (three per gender) for BMX at the Olympics, as a result of the nation's runner-up placement for men and top finish for women in the UCI Olympic Ranking List of June 1, 2021.

Diving

The Netherlands entered two divers into the Olympic competition by finishing in the top twelve of their respective events at the 2019 FINA World Championships.

Equestrian

Dutch equestrians qualified a full squad each in the team dressage and jumping competitions by virtue of a top-six finish at the 2018 FEI World Equestrian Games in Tryon, North Carolina, United States. Meanwhile, two eventing spots were awarded to the Dutch equestrians, based on the results in the individual FEI Olympic rankings for Group A (North Western Europe).

Dutch equestrian squads for dressage, eventing and jumping were named on July 5, 2021.

Dressage
Dinja van Liere and Haute Couture have been named the travelling reserve.

Qualification Legend: Q = Qualified for the final; q = Qualified for the final as a lucky loser

Eventing

Jumping
Harrie Smolders and Bingo du Parc have been named the travelling reserve. They were entered as a substitution for the team final.

Fencing
 
The Netherlands entered one fencer into the Olympic competition. Set to compete at his fourth consecutive Games, Bas Verwijlen claimed a spot in the men's épée as one of the highest-ranked fencers vying for qualification from Europe in the FIE Adjusted Official Rankings.

Field hockey

Summary

Men's tournament

Netherlands men's national field hockey team qualified for the Olympics by securing one of the seven tickets available and defeating Pakistan in a two-legged playoff at the Amsterdam leg of the 2019 FIH Olympic Qualifiers.

Team roster

Group play

Quarterfinal

Women's tournament

Netherlands women's national field hockey team qualified for the Games by winning the gold medal at the 2019 EuroHockey Nations Championships in Antwerp, Belgium.

Team roster

Group play

Quarterfinal

Semifinal

Gold medal game

Football

Summary

Women's tournament

Netherlands women's national football team qualified for the Games by securing a top-three finish at the 2019 FIFA Women's World Cup in France, defeating the Italians in the quarterfinal round to reach the country's first women's Olympic tournament.

Team roster

Group play

Quarterfinal

Golf

Gymnastics

Artistic
The Netherlands fielded a full squad of five gymnasts (one man and four women) into the Olympic competition. The women's squad claimed one of the remaining nine spots in the team all-around, while an additional berth was awarded to a lone Dutch male gymnast, who competed in the individual all-around and apparatus events at the 2019 World Artistic Gymnastics Championships in Stuttgart, Germany.

Men

Women
Team

Individual

Qualification legend: Q=Qualified for final; R1=First reserve
 Qualified for final after withdrawal of another athlete.

Handball

Summary

Women's tournament

Netherlands women's national handball team qualified for the Olympics by winning the gold medal and securing an outright berth at the final match of the 2019 World Championships in Kumamoto.

Team roster

Group play

Quarterfinal

Judo

Men

Women

Mixed

Rowing

The Netherlands qualified twelve out of fourteen boats for each of the following rowing classes into the Olympic regatta, with the majority of crews confirming Olympic places for their boats at the 2019 FISA World Championships in Ottensheim, Austria. Meanwhile, the women's coxless pair rowers were added to the Dutch roster with their top-two finish at the 2021 FISA Final Qualification Regatta in Lucerne, Switzerland.

Men

Women

Qualification Legend: FA=Final A (medal); FB=Final B (non-medal); FC=Final C (non-medal); FD=Final D (non-medal); FE=Final E (non-medal); FF=Final F (non-medal); OB=Olympic best time; SA/B=Semifinals A/B; SC/D=Semifinals C/D; SE/F=Semifinals E/F; QF=Quarterfinals; R=Repechage

Sailing

Dutch sailors qualified one boat in each of the following classes through the 2018 Sailing World Championships, the class-associated Worlds, and the continental regattas.

At the end of the European Championships (2019 and 2020), nine sailors were officially named to the Dutch team for Tokyo 2021, including reigning Olympic champion Marit Bouwmeester, world skiff champions Annemiek Bekkering and Annette Duetz, and Finn yachtsman Nicholas Heiner, who beat triple Olympian Pieter-Jan Postma for the top spot in the selection stage. Meanwhile, windsurfer Kiran Badloe overthrew his countryman and two-time defending champion Dorian van Rijsselberghe to take the men's RS:X spot at the 2020 Worlds, joining with the rest of the Dutch team on his Olympic debut in Tokyo.

Men

Women

M = Medal race; EL = Eliminated – did not advance into the medal race

Skateboarding

The Netherlands qualified three skateboarders in the women's street event at the Games based on the Olympic World Skateboarding Rankings List of 30 June 2021.

Swimming 

Dutch swimmers further achieved qualifying standards in the following events (up to a maximum of 2 swimmers in each event at the Olympic Qualifying Time (OQT), and potentially 1 at the Olympic Selection Time (OST)): To assure their selection to the Olympic team, swimmers must attain a time equal to or faster than the twelfth-placed mark in the semifinals of their respective individual pool events at the 2019 FINA World Championships, while racing at one of the following meets: Swim Cup Amsterdam (13–15 December 2019), two stages of the Dutch Open Championships (first – 3–6 December 2020; second – 25–27 June 2021), and LEN Swimming Cup (9–11 April 2021).

Men

Women

Mixed

 Withdrew from the swim-off.
 Swimmers who participated in the heats only.

Table tennis

The Netherlands entered one athlete into the table tennis competition at the Games. Rio 2016 Olympian Britt Eerland scored an initial-match final triumph to book one of the five available places in the women's singles at the 2021 ITTF World Qualification Tournament in Doha, Qatar.

Taekwondo

The Netherlands entered one athlete into the taekwondo competition at the Games. Rio 2016 Olympian and 2017 world bronze medalist Reshmie Oogink secured a spot in the women's heavyweight category (+67 kg) with a top two finish at the 2021 European Qualification Tournament in Sofia, Bulgaria.

Tennis

Triathlon

The Netherlands qualified four triathletes (two per gender) for the following events at the Games by finishing among the top seven nations in the ITU Mixed Relay Olympic Rankings.

Individual

Relay

Volleyball

Beach
The Netherlands men's and women's beach volleyball teams qualified directly for the Olympics by virtue of their nation's top 15 placement in the FIVB Olympic Rankings of 13 June 2021.

Water polo 

Summary

Women's tournament
 
Netherlands women's national water polo team qualified for the Olympics by advancing to the final match and securing an outright berth at the 2020 World Olympic Qualification Tournament in Trieste, Italy. This will mark the country's return to the sport after a thirteen-year absence.

Team roster

Group play

Quarterfinal

Classification semifinal

Fifth place game

Weightlifting

The Netherlands entered one weightlifter after the tripartite commission invitation quotas for +109 kg events had not been allocated.

See also 
 Netherlands at the 2020 Summer Paralympics

References

Nations at the 2020 Summer Olympics
2020
2021 in Dutch sport